Horntvedt Glacier is a small glacier flowing to the north coast of the island of Bouvetøya.  It is situated immediately east of Cape Circoncision.  It was first charted in 1898 by a German expedition under Carl Chun, and recharted in December 1927 by a Norwegian expedition which named it for Harald Horntvedt (1879-1946), the captain of the expedition ship Norvegia.

See also
 List of glaciers in the Antarctic
 Glaciology

References

Glaciers of Bouvet Island